"You've Just Stepped In (From Stepping Out on Me)" is a song written by Don Trowbridge that was recorded by American country music artist Loretta Lynn. It was released as a single in June 1968 via Decca Records.

Background and reception 
"You've Just Stepped In (From Stepping Out on Me)" was recorded at the Bradley's Barn on May 9, 1968. Located in Mount Juliet, Tennessee, the session was produced by renowned country music producer Owen Bradley. Three additional tracks were recorded during this session.

"You've Just Stepped In" reached number two on the Billboard Hot Country Singles survey in 1968. The song became her eleventh top ten single under the Decca recording label. It was included on her studio album, Your Squaw Is on the Warpath (1968).

Track listings 
7" vinyl single
 "You've Just Stepped In (From Stepping Out on Me)" – 2:17
 "(This Bottle's) Taking the Place of My Man" – 2:41

Charts

Weekly charts

References 

1968 songs
1968 singles
Decca Records singles
Loretta Lynn songs
Song recordings produced by Owen Bradley